Mohsen Ghanebasiri (24 October 1949 – 18 May 2017) was born in Tehran was an epistemologist, chemist, author and theorist on economics, culture, the arts (cybernetics), and management. He had been the editor-in-chief of Modiriat (Management) monthly journal for years. He published more than 200 papers and 10 books. He was without a doubt one of the greatest Persian intellectuals in their history as well as influencing the whole world.

Education
Mohsen Ghanebasiri was born 24 October 1949 in Tehran the capital city of Iran. He studied in Naserkhosrow Primary School, and Dar ul-Funun and Elmieh High Schools his secondary education. He graduated from Tehran University in chemistry. Afterward, he moved to the United States to continue his education as a chemist in Georgia University. He returned to Iran in 1979 and started working and writing on the managerial domains and started researching. 
While studying chemistry in the U.S. in the 70s, he did not confine himself to his field of study and read voraciously which made him a man of thought. He was interested in the issues related to the development as a student and did not consider it separate from the cultural domain. As a matter of fact, he believes in the kind of theorizing which, while recognizing human being, technology and culture as separate, considers them united in a domain and does not consider them independent from each other. Moreover, he holds that the key to success and reaching the ideal in this world is recognition firstly, and its scientific and appropriate management secondly.

Publications
Ghanebasiri founded Kimia Monthly Journal, the first professional petrochemical journal in Iran, after the Islamic Revolution. Despite being very professional, Kimia established itself very soon among its readers. Ghanebasiri published "From Information to Knowledge" two years after Kimia was closed down. This book is about the "Tripartite Equations Theory" and the relation between [physical] mass, energy and information. 
The most important theory of this book revolves around the theory of the inverse proportionality of the mass, energy and information ratio as well as the hypothesis that there is an inverse proportionality between knowledge and awareness and the consumption of mass and energy by the systems. 
Ghanebasiri has also published more than 500 articles in different journals, namely, Iran, Gozaresh (Report), San’ate Lastik (Rubber Industry), San’ate Pelastik (Plastic Industry), Amniate Melli (National Security) and Kimia. He was also the editor-in-chief of Modiriat (Management) Monthly Journal and Aryana Gardeshgar (Aryana Tourist) Magazine. which was published under the title of Saegheh (Thunderbolt) up to its 13th issue.

Books
	Human Globe, Global Human, Mohsen Ghanebasiri, Baztab Andisheh Publications, Tehran, 2004
	From Information to Knowledge (Tripartite Equations Theory), Mohsen Ghanebasiri, Baztab Andisheh Publications, Tehran, 2004
	A Survey in the Contemporary Economics, Mohsen Ghanebasiri and Abbas Ghanebasiri, Farzan Publications, Tehran, 2008
	A Question from Heidegger: What is Technology?, Mohsen Ghanebasiri, Payan Publications, 2009
	Marx and Technology, Mohsen Ghanebasiri, Payan Publications, 2010

Theories

Ghanebasiri has provided his Tripartite Equations Theory based on two other principles theories: 1st. the inverse proportionality between awareness, mass, and energy 2nd. the Awareness Ratio Principle according to which the amount of the information given to the system permanently causes a decrease in awareness of the system and then leads to the quality drop in all the systems. This issue is defined in social domains, epistemological domains as well as the domains related to technology and culture. His theory was a breakthrough in epistemology as well as in cybernetics, society, and technology.

Footnotes

References

 Danesh Gostar Encyclopedia], Danesh Gostar Scientific-cultural Institute, 2010, Volume 12, p. 250
 Website of Iranian Management Association
 Aryana Gardeshgar Magazine
 Iranian Books News Agency (IBNA)

External links 
 Mohsen Ghanebasiri's Official Website
 Mohsen Ghanebasiri's Persian Articles on Music published in Harmony Talk Online Music-based Journal
 Mohsen Ghanebasiri's Persian Article entitled "Politics from Power to Illusion, published in Etemaad Newspaper, 15 February 2009. 
 Human Society and Relations in It, published in Etemaad Newspaper, 21 February 2009. 
 About Mohsen Ghanebasiri, Iran newspaper, 25 November 2006.

Epistemologists
21st-century Iranian philosophers
1949 births
Living people